Shabak Samech (Hebrew: שבק"ס,שב"ק סמך) (aka Shabak S) is one of the first recognized hip-hop groups to come out of Israel. Their sound is primarily hip-hop, but it includes elements of rapcore, dancehall, ska, and funk. Their sound has been compared to the Beastie Boys, Ugly Duckling, Rage Against the Machine, Bionic Jive, Body Count, Red Hot Chili Peppers, Jimmy Cliff, Elephant Man, and more. The group had two and three vocalists (Fuck A and Miro being replaced by Nimi Nim for their second album, Be'atifa shel Mamatak), two guitarists, a drummer and a bassist. The group continued to distinguish itself from the rest of the hip-hop acts in Israel as the scene continued to grow with a unique sound and minimal reliance on beats and samples.

The word Shabak as it is written in Hebrew (שבק) is a misspelling of the Hebrew acronym for the Internal General Security Service of Israel.

Timeline
 1992 – Shabak Samech original members (Plompy, Mook D., Fuck A, Miro, Assaf B. and Albert) form the band, then called "FFM" ("Floating Fat-Man")
 1993 – Assaf B. leaves and is replaced with Piloni. Davidi joins as bassist, replacing Mook E. (who was playing bass at the time). The name is changed to "Shabak Samech".
 1994 – Mook D. returns as vocalist, and James joins as drummer, replacing Albert.
 1995 – First album, Shabak 7, is recorded in January. First radio airplay is in July, 1995 ("Shin Business" from Shabak 7). The album goes out for sale in September.
 1996 –  Miro leaves and is replaced by Nimi Nim.
 1997 – Fuck A leaves. The second album, Be'atifa shel Mamatak, is released in August.
 1998 – Live album released. Nimi Nim leaves late in the year.
 1999 – Miro and Fuck A return. The band records C'naan 2000.
 2000 – C'naan 2000 is released.
 2000 – Shabak Samech disbands. Mook D. goes on to pursue a reggae/rap solo career as Muki.
 2003 – Mook D. and Piloni start a record label, Shabak Music.
 2007 – Shabak Samech reunite and have a reunion concert. They began a small tour soon after. The fourth studio album, Boom carnival is released in 2008
 2012 – Shabak 5th Album, Parra Parra, is released on 1 September.

Band members

Current members
 Nimi Nim aka Nimrod Reshef – vocals (1996–1998, 2007–present)
 Miro aka Amir Yeruham – frontman/vocals (1992–1996, 1999–2000, 2007–present)
 Fuck A aka Chemi aka Kfir Artzi – vocals (1992–1997, 1999–2000, 2007–present)
 Plompy B. aka Amir Besser – guitars (1992–2000, 2007–present)
 Piloni ("Little Elephant") aka Dani Kark – guitars (1993–2000, 2007–present)
 Davidi aka Master David aka David Muskatel – bass (1993–2000, 2007–present)
 James aka Gal Sivan - Drums (1995 - present)

Former members
 Albert – drums (1992–1994)
 Assaf B. – guitars (1992–1993)
 Mook D. aka Danny Niv- vocals, bass (1992-2000, 2007-2010)

Discography
 Shabak – 1995
 Be'atifa shel Mamtak (trans: In A Candy Wrapper) – 1997
 Shabak Behofa'a (live album) – 1998
 C'naan 2000 – 2000
 Boom Carnaval – 2008
 Parra Parra – 2012

See also
 Israeli hip hop

References

External links

 Shabak Samech on Facebook

Israeli hip hop groups
Jewish hip hop groups
Jewish punk rock groups